Brian Mariano (born 22 January 1985) is a Curaçaoan sprinter who specializes in the 100 and 200 metres and starts for the Netherlands, formerly for Netherlands Antilles until October 1, 2010. He finished fourth-fastest in the men's 60 metres heats at the 2010 IAAF World Indoor Championships in Doha, but was disqualified in the semifinals. He won a bronze medal in the 4x100 metres relay at the 2010 Central American and Caribbean Games in Mayaguez alongside Prince Kwidama, Curtis Cock and Churandy Martina.

Mariano finished sixth in the 60 metres at the 2011 European Athletics Indoor Championships in Paris, representing the Netherlands for the first time.

Mariano ran his personal best over 100 m and 200 m at the UTEP Invitational on 10 April 2010.

After a race on 6 February 2016 he tested positive in a doping test.

Personal best

References

External links

1985 births
Living people
People from Willemstad
Dutch male sprinters
Dutch Antillean male sprinters
Athletes (track and field) at the 2012 Summer Olympics
Olympic athletes of the Netherlands
Athletes (track and field) at the 2007 Pan American Games
Pan American Games competitors for the Netherlands Antilles
European Athletics Championships medalists
Doping cases in athletics
Central American and Caribbean Games bronze medalists for the Netherlands Antilles
Central American and Caribbean Games gold medalists for the Netherlands Antilles
Competitors at the 2006 Central American and Caribbean Games
Competitors at the 2010 Central American and Caribbean Games
Central American and Caribbean Games medalists in athletics